Fairlie is an unincorporated agricultural community in northeastern Hunt County, Texas, United States. It is located on State Highway 11 about 11 miles from Greenville, between Commerce and Wolfe City.

History
Fairlie was named after Fairlee Webster, a resident of the town. Not much is known about Fairlee or why the town was named after him/her. By 1892 Fairlie had enough residents to receive its first post office. By 1904, the population of Fairlie had reached 248. The post office shut down in the late 1980s and by the year 2000, Fairlie's population had dropped to 80.

Facts
There are 3 notable roads in Fairlie, TX. Both Hwy 50 and Hwy 11 cross through Fairlie and are intersected by FM 1563, which runs east and west through old downtown. As of 2010 there are no traffic signals in Fairlie. Now Fairlie is home to the Ball Seed Clover company, located in the old railroad office.

References 

 Handbook of Texas Online – Fairlie, TX

Unincorporated communities in Hunt County, Texas
Unincorporated communities in Texas